Elaeocarpus symingtonii is a species of flowering plant in the Elaeocarpaceae family. It is a tree endemic to Peninsular Malaysia. It is threatened by habitat loss.

References

symingtonii
Endemic flora of Peninsular Malaysia
Trees of Peninsular Malaysia
Conservation dependent plants
Near threatened flora of Asia
Taxonomy articles created by Polbot